Joshua Gilbert (born 23 September 1993) is a Bermudian cricketer (not) .  Gilbert is a right-handed batsman who bowls right-arm off break.  He was born in Bermuda.

In 2010, Gilbert made his debut for Bermuda in a first-class match against the United Arab Emirates in the 2009-10 Intercontinental Shield at the National Stadium, Hamilton.  He scored seven runs in this match, as well as taking three wickets, those of Arshad Ali, Khurram Khan and Saqib Ali, for the cost of 85 runs from 23 overs in the United Arab Emirates first-innings.  Following the match he made his List A debut against the same opponents, taking figures of 4/47 in the match, as well as making his Twenty20 debut against the same opposition following this match.

He was selected as part of Bermuda's squad for the World Twenty20 Qualifier.

References

External links
Joshua Gilbert at ESPNcricinfo
Joshua Gilbert at CricketArchive

1993 births
Living people
Bermudian cricketers